Kulus may refer to:
Külüs, Azerbaijan
Kulus, Iran
 Kulus, a character in Kwakwaka'wakw mythology